Emet V'Emunah (True and faithful) is the paragraph that is recited immediately following Shema during Maariv. Its recitation fulfills the obligation to recall the Exodus from Egypt during the evening.

Themes
Emet V'Emunah is a parallel prayer to Emet Vayatziv, which is recited during Shacharit immediately following Shema. But unlike Emet Vayatziv, which speaks of the redemptions from the past of the Jewish ancestors, Emet V'Emunah relates the future redemption of the Jewish people.

Emet V'Emunah describes the chosenness of the Jewish people. The prayer describes the Jewish people as unique and distinctive, and with a mission to G-d.

Alternative version for Sabbath
In the Italian rite (based on the Siddur or Rav Saadya Gaon), there is an alternative version of this blessing for the Sabbath, beginning with "emet ve-emunah ba-shevii".

References

Maariv
Hebrew words and phrases in Jewish prayers and blessings